Chino del tomate virus (CdTV) is a plant pathogenic virus of the family Geminiviridae.

External links
ICTVdB - The Universal Virus Database: Chino del tomate virus

Viral plant pathogens and diseases
Begomovirus